Jaime Annexy Fajardo (11 December 1927 in Mayagüez, Puerto Rico – 8 August 2000 in Tarpon Springs, Florida) was a Puerto Rican hammer thrower who competed in the 1952 Summer Olympics. Jaime Annexy Fajardo served in the United States Marine Corps during the Korean War, lived in Puerto Rico after college until 1977, settled in Florida, and established Eureka Insurance Brokers.  Jaime Annexy Fajardo was buried at the Puerto Rico Memorial Cemetery in Carolina, Puerto Rico.

References

1927 births
2000 deaths
Olympic track and field athletes of Puerto Rico
Athletes (track and field) at the 1952 Summer Olympics
Presidents of the Puerto Rico Olympic Committee
United States Marine Corps personnel of the Korean War
United States Marines
People from Mayagüez, Puerto Rico
Puerto Rican male hammer throwers
Puerto Rican United States Marines
Central American and Caribbean Games gold medalists for Puerto Rico
Competitors at the 1950 Central American and Caribbean Games
Central American and Caribbean Games medalists in athletics